Akiba's Trip is a Japanese video game franchise by developer Acquire. The franchise consists of five games and an anime television series adaptation by Gonzo that aired between January 4, 2017 and March 29, 2017.

Video games

Akiba's Trip
The original Akiba's Trip game was released on PlayStation Portable in Japan by Acquire on May 19, 2011. An updated version, titled Akiba's Trip Plus, was released for PSP on June 14, 2012. A PlayStation 4, Nintendo Switch and Microsoft Windows remake was released on July 20, 2021 in the U.S. and Europe, titled Akiba's Trip: Hellbound & Debriefed.

Akiba's Trip for GREE
The second release in the franchise, Akiba's Trip for GREE was a Japan-only free-to-play smartphone game using the GREE platform. It focused on acquiring maid cafés through a touchscreen quick time event version of the original's combat engine. The game launched on January 20, 2012 for Android and on June 29, 2012 for iOS. Service was discontinued and the game was made unavailable on November 26, 2012.

Akiba's Trip: Undead & Undressed

Acquire released Akiba's Trip 2 on PlayStation 3 and PlayStation Vita in Japan on November 7, 2013, and on PlayStation 4 on July 3, 2014.  XSEED Games released the game in North America under the title Akiba's Trip: Undead & Undressed.  They released the game on PS3 and PSVita on August 12, 2014, on PS4 on November 25, 2014, and on PC on May 26, 2015. Additionally, NIS America released the game in Europe.

Akiba's Trip Festa!
Akiba's Trip Festa! was released for PC and Android in November 30, 2016.

Akiba's Beat

Akiba's Beat, the first action RPG game in the franchise, was originally scheduled for a fall 2016 release on PS4 and PS Vita, but was later delayed to December 15, 2016 on PS4 and March 16, 2017 on PS Vita.  The game is directed by Kōta Takano, while ClariS is performing the theme song, "again". XSEED Games released the game in North America on May 16, 2017. It was also released in Europe by PQube on May 19, 2017.

References

External links
  
  at DMM Games 
  
Akiba's Trip Official Website (in English)

2011 video games
2016 video games
GungHo Online Entertainment franchises
PlayStation Portable-only games
PlayStation Portable games
PlayStation 3 games
PlayStation Vita games
PlayStation 4 games
Windows games
Android (operating system) games
IOS games
Japan-exclusive video games
Video games developed in Japan
Video games set in Japan
Role-playing video games
Video games adapted into television shows
Video games with cel-shaded animation
Nintendo Switch games
Acquire (company) games